X-Press Pearl was a Singapore-registered Super Eco 2700–class container ship. It was operated by X-Press Feeders. 

On 20 May 2021, X-Press Pearl caught fire off the coast of Colombo, Sri Lanka. The vessel was engulfed in flames by 27 May and declared a total loss. It was still afloat, and the fire was thought to be under control by Sri Lankan firefighters by the late hours of 27 May 2021. After burning for 12 days, the vessel sank on 2 June as it was being towed to deeper waters. The incident was deemed the worst marine ecological disaster in Sri Lankan history for the chemical products that spilled.

According to X-Press Feeders, salvage operations to remove the wreck began in November 2021. All work on site is expected to be completed by April 2023. Salvage work was interrupted during the southwest monsoon from late April to November 2022.

Construction and operational history 
X-Press Pearl was built by Zhoushan Changhong International Shipyard Co. Ltd at Zhoushan, China for Singapore-based X-Press Feeders, along with its sister ship X-Press Mekong. The 37,000-deadweight tonne (DWT) container vessel could carry 2,743 twenty-foot equivalent units. The ship was launched on 28 September 2020 and delivered on 10 February 2021.

The vessel was deployed on the Straits to Middle East (SMX) service of X-Press Feeders, from Port Klang (Malaysia) via Singapore and Jebel Ali (Dubai, UAE) to Hamad Port (Qatar). The return voyage to Malaysia was via Hazira (India) and Colombo (Sri Lanka). The vessel had made three voyages, calling at Colombo on 17 March and 18 April, and caught fire shortly after arriving for its third call at the port on 19 May.

Fire
X-Press Pearl carried 1,486 containers, with contents including 25 tons of nitric acid (which can be used in the manufacture of fertilisers and explosives), other chemicals, cosmetics and low-density polyethylene (LDPE) pellets, when it departed the port of Hazira on 15 May 2021, arriving off Colombo on 19 May. By 11 May the crew had discovered that a container loaded at Jebel Ali was leaking nitric acid, and had requested both Hamad and Hazira ports to allow it to be offloaded, but permission was not granted. According to X-Press Feeders, the requests were denied as "there were no specialist facilities or expertise immediately available to deal with the leaking acid", and the vessel proceeded on its planned journey to Colombo.

The ship reached Colombo on the night of 19 May and was anchored in the outer harbor awaiting a berth. The ship did not declare an emergency for the cargo acid leak. On 20 May the ship's agents requested a re-working of the container. Harbour Master Nirmal de Silva said as a maritime hub, Colombo had the expertise to help. The vessel then issued its first report of a fire, which the crew had put out using its on-board system.

The Sri Lanka Navy, along with the Sri Lanka Ports Authority, which boarded the ship in order to find out the cause of the fire, suspected that the fire might have started as a result of the reaction of chemicals being transported on the ship. During the fire incident, the vessel had a crew of 25 members on board.

Though initial reports linked the incident to leaking acid, Harbor Master De Silva said the fire had broken out in the number 2 hold of X-Press Pearl while the container was stacked on deck. A fuller investigation was needed to determine the cause, he said.

On 25 May, a large explosion took place inside the vessel and all 25 crew members were evacuated. Two Indian crew members who sustained injuries during the explosion were admitted to the Colombo's National Hospital of Sri Lanka.

The fire continued to blaze during 25 May, and by late afternoon containers were dropping off the vessel into the sea. The Sri Lanka Maritime Environmental Protection Authority (MEPA) declared a Tier II oil spill event from on-board bunkers as the blaze got worse. India dispatched firefighting and pollution control Coast Guard vessels, a tug and a Dornier maritime reconnaissance aircraft to help containment measures, and fishermen were asked to stay clear of the ship.

Chairperson of MEPA Dharshani Lahandapura said on 26 May that 378 tonnes of oil were on board the vessel and about half could leak into the sea after the fire ended. Bad weather prevented the deployment of oil-containment booms around the ship, but authorities were ready to clean up any oil that reached the shore. By morning, burnt debris and some fallen cargo were washing up on Sri Lanka's Negombo coast. On 29 May, X-Press Pearl was still smouldering and belching smoke, though flames were down. Hull integrity was still intact. Firefighting tugs continued to pour water on the ship. The Sri Lanka Air Force dropped dry chemical powder. The Indian Coast Guard vessel ICG Samudra Prahari, a pollution control ship, joined the task force. By the morning of 30 May, the fire was mostly out and water was still being sprayed. X-Press Feeders said salvors were looking at boarding the vessel to set up a tow connection. Salvors boarded the vessel on 1 June for the first inspection. Salvors found the engine room flooded and smoke still coming out from cargo hold 1, 2 and 3 intermittently.

Rescue operations 
It was revealed that the fire had been brought under control on 21 May and the cooling efforts were continued to prevent the fire from flaring up. On 22 May, the Sri Lanka Air Force deployed a Bell 212 helicopter in the rescue operations. Out of the 25 evacuated crew, two were in the hospital. On May 25, India dispatched ICG Vaibhav, ICG Dornier and Tug Water Lilly to help the Sri Lankan Navy extinguish the fire. India's specialised pollution response vessel Samudra Prahari arrived on May 29. India had named the rescue efforts Operation Sagar Araksha 2.

On 2 June 2021, X-Press Feeders issued a statement saying the company "regret[s] to report that despite salvors successfully boarding the vessel and attaching a tow wire, efforts to move the ship to deeper waters have failed".

Most of it is submerged, and the site is continuously monitored by a dedicated ship.

Environmental damage 
Sri Lanka's Marine Environmental Protection Authority (MEPA) said it was assessing the environmental damage and collecting evidence. Plans were made to submit an interim claim. Plastic resin pellet pollution from spilled cargo was washing up on Sri Lanka's beaches from 27 May. LDPE pellets have also been washed onto nearby land. According to MEPA, there were three containers of plastic pellets on board the ship, each weighing .

NPR's Laurel Wamsley described the incident as an environmental disaster in June 2021. 

Health experts and MEPA also warned that there are possibilities for mild acid rains in Sri Lanka due to the emission of nitrogen dioxide. Sri Lanka authorities banned coastal fishing from Kalutara to Negombo, over contamination fears. About 5,600 one-day boats were unable to venture out and the government promised compensation. People were also urged by MEPA not to touch any debris from the container ship which is contaminated with toxic substances.

A police complaint was made to investigate negligence. It was also assembling an expert panel to assess longer-term environmental damage. Dead fish and turtles continued to wash up on Sri Lanka's beaches and were examined to determine if their deaths were caused by the spill. Out of the 1,486 containers, 81 of those were regarded as toxic harmful dangerous containers inclusive of five tons of nitric acid.

In June 2021, it was reported that the container ship had sunk, which would trigger adverse effects on marine species. On 2 June, salvors set up a line towing X-Press Pearl away from the coast when the stern hit bottom, forcing them to abort the operation. Sri Lanka Navy Captain Indika de Silva said it was not clear whether there was any un-burnt bunker oil left on the vessel but authorities were on the watch for an oil spill.

Sri Lanka ordered salvors to remove bunker oil, if any had survived the blaze, and take containment measures. X-Press Feeders said it had hired Oil Spill Response Limited to support the effort. The operators had engaged SMIT Salvage when the crisis first started.

Chief Executive of X-Press Feeders Shmuel Yoskovitz apologized to the people of Sri Lanka for the incident. "I'd like to express my deep regrets and apologies to the Sri Lankan people for the harm this incident has caused to the livelihood and to the environment of Sri Lanka," he was quoted as saying in an interview with Singapore's Channel News Asia. Authorities in Sri Lanka continued to collect debris and plastic pellets in what was described as the biggest ever nurdle hunt in the country. About 34 containers had been filled with debris from X-Press Pearl including nurdles. Authorities had collected 1,075 tonnes of debris, including sand, which were stored in containers by 8 June. 

As of 15 June 2021, about 40 dead turtles were reported to have washed up on the shore. In addition to turtles, many species of fish, whales, and at least six dolphins also washed up with multiple burn markings; aquatic species are also seriously affected by the dispersal of the plastic pellets.

Investigations 
Investigations into the fire on board the container ship were initiated on 30 May. C. D. Wickramaratne, Inspector General of Police, instructed the police to hand over the investigations to Sri Lanka's Criminal Investigation Department, with authorities warning of possible legal action against X-Press Feeders, the vessel's owners. On 31 May, a police spokesman revealed that a ten-member police special team had begun to record statements from the captain and chief engineer of X-Press Pearl. Sri Lanka Police questioned the chief officer of X-Press Pearl over two days on the vessel's container stowage plan. The ship was carrying multiple classes of dangerous goods including sodium hydroxide (caustic soda) in holds as well as at least one container of nitric acid which was leaking on deck. The voyage data recorder (VDR) or black box, was also recovered. On 16 June 2021, the chairman of local shipping agency, Arjuna Hettiarachchi representing X-Press Pearl ship who was identified as the main suspect regarding the incident was granted bail by the Colombo High Court.  

On 31 October, OpenFacto, the French Collective for open source research, published an investigation tracking the nitric acid container to Iran where it was allegedly sold by a broker company called ChemiPakhsh Paykan and produced by Esfahan Chemical Industries, a sanctioned affiliate of the Iranian Ministry of Defence.

Economic impact 
Local fishermen in Sri Lanka were ordered to stay ashore because of the pollution; it may affect local economies. Denzil Fernando, a regional fishing union chief, stated that the fishing ban will affect 4,300 families. Rob Hawes, head of marine at loss adjuster Crawford & Co. estimated that the cargo loss of the X-Press Pearl could range between $30 million and $50 million in addition to the loss of the vessel.

See also
Environmental issues in Sri Lanka

References 

Maritime incidents in 2021
Container ships
2021 in Sri Lanka
June 2021 events in Asia
Ships built in China
Environmental disasters in Asia
Ship fires
Shipwrecks in the Indian Ocean
2021 fires in Asia
2021 disasters in Asia
2020 ships
Environmentalism in Sri Lanka
Merchant ships of Singapore